The Moldovan Yachting Federation is the national governing body for the sport of sailing in Moldova, recognised by the International Sailing Federation.

Famous Sailors
See :Category:Moldovan sailors

Olympic sailing
See :Category:Olympic sailors of Moldova

Yacht Clubs
See :Category:Yacht clubs in Moldova

References

Moldova
Sailing
1996 establishments in Moldova